These 205 species belong to the genus Hapithus, true crickets.

Hapithus species

 Hapithus abejas (Otte, D. & Perez-Gelabert, 2009) c g
 Hapithus achicos (Otte, D. & Perez-Gelabert, 2009) c g
 Hapithus acutus (Saussure, 1878) c g
 Hapithus adaptos (Otte, D. & Perez-Gelabert, 2009) c g
 Hapithus adorabilis (Otte, D. & Perez-Gelabert, 2009) c g
 Hapithus aeschyntelos (Otte, D., 2006) c g
 Hapithus agastos (Otte, D. & Perez-Gelabert, 2009) c g
 Hapithus agitator Uhler, 1864 i c g b (restless bush cricket)
 Hapithus aigenetes Otte, D. & Perez-Gelabert, 2009 c g
 Hapithus akation Otte, D. & Perez-Gelabert, 2009 c g
 Hapithus alayoi (Otte, D. & Perez-Gelabert, 2009) c g
 Hapithus anactorios (Otte, D. & Perez-Gelabert, 2009) c g
 Hapithus annulicornis (Saussure, 1874) c g
 Hapithus anoptos (Otte, D. & Perez-Gelabert, 2009) c g
 Hapithus antillarum (Saussure, 1874) c g
 Hapithus antiphonos (Otte, D. & Perez-Gelabert, 2009) c g
 Hapithus aphenges (Otte, D. & Perez-Gelabert, 2009) c g
 Hapithus aphetos (Otte, D. & Perez-Gelabert, 2009) c g
 Hapithus apito (Otte, D. & Perez-Gelabert, 2009) c g
 Hapithus atroapex Gorochov, 2017 c g
 Hapithus auditor Otte, D., 2006 c g
 Hapithus aztecus (Saussure, 1874) c g
 Hapithus bacaju (Otte, D. & Perez-Gelabert, 2009) c g
 Hapithus basilios (Otte, D. & Perez-Gelabert, 2009) c g
 Hapithus bellatulus (Otte, D. & Perez-Gelabert, 2009) c g
 Hapithus bellus Otte, D. & Perez-Gelabert, 2009 c g
 Hapithus brevipennis (Saussure, 1897) i c g b (short-winged bush cricket)
 Hapithus cabralense Otte, D. & Perez-Gelabert, 2009 c g
 Hapithus canaster (Otte, D. & Perez-Gelabert, 2009) c g
 Hapithus cantrix Otte, D. & Perez-Gelabert, 2009 c g
 Hapithus catacrotos (Otte, D. & Perez-Gelabert, 2009) c g
 Hapithus cayennensis (Saussure, 1897) c g
 Hapithus celadinos (Otte, D. & Perez-Gelabert, 2009) c g
 Hapithus celerans (Otte, D. & Perez-Gelabert, 2009) c g
 Hapithus cerbatana Otte, D. & Perez-Gelabert, 2009 c g
 Hapithus chronios (Otte, D. & Perez-Gelabert, 2009) c g
 Hapithus conspersa (Saussure, 1874) c g
 Hapithus corrugatus (Saussure, 1897) c g
 Hapithus costalis (Saussure, 1878) c g
 Hapithus cresbios (Otte, D. & Perez-Gelabert, 2009) c g
 Hapithus crucis (Fabricius, 1787) c g
 Hapithus ctypodes (Otte, D. & Perez-Gelabert, 2009) c g
 Hapithus cucurucho Otte, D. & Perez-Gelabert, 2009 c g
 Hapithus cuphos (Otte, D. & Perez-Gelabert, 2009) c g
 Hapithus curiosus (Otte, D., 2006) c g
 Hapithus cydalimos (Otte, D. & Perez-Gelabert, 2009) c g
 Hapithus demissus (Otte, D. & Perez-Gelabert, 2009) c g
 Hapithus dignus Otte, D. & Perez-Gelabert, 2009 c g
 Hapithus diplastes (Walker, T.J., 1969) c g
 Hapithus domingensis (Saussure, 1878) c g
 Hapithus dubius (Caudell, 1922) c g
 Hapithus dystheratos (Otte, D., 2015) c g
 Hapithus echodes (Otte, D. & Perez-Gelabert, 2009) c g
 Hapithus eclipes (Otte, D. & Perez-Gelabert, 2009) c g
 Hapithus ecplecticos (Otte, D. & Perez-Gelabert, 2009) c g
 Hapithus efferata (Otte, D. & Perez-Gelabert, 2009) c g
 Hapithus egregius (Otte, D. & Perez-Gelabert, 2009) c g
 Hapithus elisae Otte, D. & Perez-Gelabert, 2009 c g
 Hapithus elyunquensis (Otte, D., 2015) c g
 Hapithus emeljanovi Gorochov, 1993 c g
 Hapithus empsychos (Otte, D. & Perez-Gelabert, 2009) c g
 Hapithus energos (Otte, D. & Perez-Gelabert, 2009) c g
 Hapithus epagogos (Otte, D. & Perez-Gelabert, 2009) c g
 Hapithus epakros (Otte, D. & Perez-Gelabert, 2009) c g
 Hapithus eperastos (Otte, D. & Perez-Gelabert, 2009) c g
 Hapithus epholcos (Otte, D. & Perez-Gelabert, 2009) c g
 Hapithus epidendrios (Otte, D. & Perez-Gelabert, 2009) c g
 Hapithus epimeles (Otte, D. & Perez-Gelabert, 2009) c g
 Hapithus eribombos (Otte, D. & Perez-Gelabert, 2009) c g
 Hapithus errabundus (Otte, D. & Perez-Gelabert, 2009) c g
 Hapithus erronea (Otte, D. & Perez-Gelabert, 2009) c g
 Hapithus eucelados (Otte, D. & Perez-Gelabert, 2009) c g
 Hapithus eumeles (Otte, D. & Perez-Gelabert, 2009) c g
 Hapithus euprepes (Otte, D. & Perez-Gelabert, 2009) c g
 Hapithus evanidus (Otte, D. & Perez-Gelabert, 2009) c g
 Hapithus eveches (Otte, D. & Perez-Gelabert, 2009) c g
 Hapithus exaitos (Otte, D. & Perez-Gelabert, 2009) c g
 Hapithus facetus (Otte, D. & Perez-Gelabert, 2009) c g
 Hapithus fascifer Gorochov, 2017 c g
 Hapithus fraudans (Otte, D. & Perez-Gelabert, 2009) c g
 Hapithus fulvescens (Saussure, 1878) c g
 Hapithus fusiformis (Walker, F., 1869) c g
 Hapithus gaudialis (Otte, D. & Perez-Gelabert, 2009) c g
 Hapithus gaumeri (Saussure, 1897) c g
 Hapithus gavisa (Otte, D. & Perez-Gelabert, 2009) c g
 Hapithus gegonos (Otte, D. & Perez-Gelabert, 2009) c g
 Hapithus gratus (Otte, D. & Perez-Gelabert, 2009) c g
 Hapithus gryllodes (Pallas, 1772) c g
 Hapithus guanense (Otte, D. & Perez-Gelabert, 2009) c g
 Hapithus gymnopta (Otte, D. & Perez-Gelabert, 2009) c g
 Hapithus habros (Otte & Perez-Gelabert, 2009)
 Hapithus habros (Otte, 2006)
 Hapithus haiti Gorochov, 2017 c g
 Hapithus helvola (Saussure, 1874) c g
 Hapithus honduras Gorochov, 2017 c g
 Hapithus idanos (Otte, D. & Perez-Gelabert, 2009) c g
 Hapithus illectans (Otte, D. & Perez-Gelabert, 2009) c g
 Hapithus illex (Otte, D. & Perez-Gelabert, 2009) c g
 Hapithus importatus (Kevan, D.K.M., 1955) c g
 Hapithus insulensis (Otte, D. & Perez-Gelabert, 2009) c g
 Hapithus irroratus (Bolívar, I., 1888) c g
 Hapithus jalisco Gorochov, 2017 c g
 Hapithus kerzhneri Gorochov, 1993 c g
 Hapithus killos (Otte, D., 2015) c g
 Hapithus kirrhos (Otte, D. & Perez-Gelabert, 2009) c g
 Hapithus klugei Gorochov, 2017 c g
 Hapithus kropion (Otte, D. & Perez-Gelabert, 2009) c g
 Hapithus krugi (Saussure, 1878) c g
 Hapithus krybelos (Otte, D. & Perez-Gelabert, 2009) c g
 Hapithus lacandona Gorochov, 2017 c g
 Hapithus latifrons (Rehn, J.A.G., 1909) c g
 Hapithus libratus Otte, D., 2006 c g
 Hapithus longivivax (Otte, D. & Perez-Gelabert, 2009) c g
 Hapithus lucreciae Otte, D. & Perez-Gelabert, 2009 c g
 Hapithus luteolira (Walker, T.J., 1969) c g
 Hapithus mabuya Otte, D. & Perez-Gelabert, 2009 c g
 Hapithus maculata (Desutter-Grandcolas & Bland, 2003) c g
 Hapithus maroniensis (Chopard, 1912) c g
 Hapithus maya (Saussure, 1897) c g
 Hapithus melodius T. J. Walker, 1977 i c g b (musical bush cricket)
 Hapithus melodos (Otte, D. & Perez-Gelabert, 2009) c g
 Hapithus mexicanus (Saussure, 1897) c g
 Hapithus montanus (Saussure, 1897) c g
 Hapithus mundula (Otte, D. & Perez-Gelabert, 2009) c g
 Hapithus musica (Saussure, 1897) c g
 Hapithus mythicos Otte, D. & Perez-Gelabert, 2009 c g
 Hapithus nablista (Saussure, 1897) c g
 Hapithus nanion (Otte, D. & Perez-Gelabert, 2009) c g
 Hapithus naskreckii (Otte, D. & Perez-Gelabert, 2009) c g
 Hapithus nigrifrons (Walker, T.J., 1969) c g
 Hapithus nocticola (Otte, D. & Perez-Gelabert, 2009) c g
 Hapithus noctimonos (Otte, D. & Perez-Gelabert, 2009) c g
 Hapithus nocturus (Otte, D. & Perez-Gelabert, 2009) c g
 Hapithus nodulosus Strohecker, 1953 c g
 Hapithus obscurella (Walker, F., 1869) c g
 Hapithus ocellaris (Saussure, 1897) c g
 Hapithus onesimos Otte, D., 2006 c g
 Hapithus orimonos (Otte, D. & Perez-Gelabert, 2009) c g
 Hapithus oriobates (Otte, D. & Perez-Gelabert, 2009) c g
 Hapithus palans (Otte, D. & Perez-Gelabert, 2009) c g
 Hapithus palenque Gorochov, 2017 c g
 Hapithus pannychios (Otte, D. & Perez-Gelabert, 2009) c g
 Hapithus paraxynticos (Otte, D. & Perez-Gelabert, 2009) c g
 Hapithus pelliciens (Otte, D. & Perez-Gelabert, 2009) c g
 Hapithus perennans (Otte, D. & Perez-Gelabert, 2009) c g
 Hapithus periphantos (Otte, D. & Perez-Gelabert, 2009) c g
 Hapithus phasma (Otte, D. & Perez-Gelabert, 2009) c g
 Hapithus piedrasense (Otte, D. & Perez-Gelabert, 2009) c g
 Hapithus pilosa (Bolívar, I., 1888) c g
 Hapithus pisina (Otte, D. & Perez-Gelabert, 2009) c g
 Hapithus planodes (Otte, D. & Perez-Gelabert, 2009) c g
 Hapithus planus (Walker, F., 1869) c g
 Hapithus polymechanus Otte, D. & Perez-Gelabert, 2009 c g
 Hapithus polyplanes (Otte, D. & Perez-Gelabert, 2009) c g
 Hapithus polypsophos (Otte, D. & Perez-Gelabert, 2009) c g
 Hapithus properatos (Otte, D. & Perez-Gelabert, 2009) c g
 Hapithus prosplatos (Otte, D. & Perez-Gelabert, 2009) c g
 Hapithus protos Otte, D. & Perez-Gelabert, 2009 c g
 Hapithus proximus Gorochov, 2017 c g
 Hapithus pudens (Otte, D. & Perez-Gelabert, 2009) c g
 Hapithus regificus (Otte, D. & Perez-Gelabert, 2009) c g
 Hapithus regillus (Otte, D. & Perez-Gelabert, 2009) c g
 Hapithus rodriguezi (Saussure, 1874) c g
 Hapithus rolphi (Saussure, 1878) c g
 Hapithus saba (Otte, D. & Perez-Gelabert, 2009) c g
 Hapithus sabaensis (Otte, D. & Perez-Gelabert, 2009) c g
 Hapithus sajoma (Otte, D. & Perez-Gelabert, 2009) c g
 Hapithus saltator (Uhler, 1864) c g
 Hapithus samanense Otte, D. & Perez-Gelabert, 2009 c g
 Hapithus saukros (Otte, D. & Perez-Gelabert, 2009) c g
 Hapithus saulcyi (Guérin-Méneville, 1844) c g
 Hapithus saussurei (Desutter-Grandcolas, 2003) c g
 Hapithus selva Gorochov, 2017 c g
 Hapithus semnos (Otte, D. & Perez-Gelabert, 2009) c g
 Hapithus sibilans (Saussure, 1878) c g
 Hapithus similis (Walker, F., 1869) c g
 Hapithus solivagus (Otte, D. & Perez-Gelabert, 2009) c g
 Hapithus spectrum (Otte, D. & Perez-Gelabert, 2009) c g
 Hapithus symphonos Otte, D., 2006 c g
 Hapithus taciturnus (Otte, D., 2006) c g
 Hapithus tenuicornis (Walker, F., 1869) c g
 Hapithus thaumasios (Otte, D. & Perez-Gelabert, 2009) c g
 Hapithus thorybodes (Otte, D. & Perez-Gelabert, 2009) c g
 Hapithus tibialis (Saussure, 1897) c g
 Hapithus tintinnans (Otte, D. & Perez-Gelabert, 2009) c g
 Hapithus trepida (Otte, D. & Perez-Gelabert, 2009) c g
 Hapithus tricornis (Walker, T.J., 1969) c g
 Hapithus turbulenta (Otte, D. & Perez-Gelabert, 2009) c g
 Hapithus tychaeos (Otte, D. & Perez-Gelabert, 2009) c g
 Hapithus tyrannicos (Otte, D. & Perez-Gelabert, 2009) c g
 Hapithus tyrannos (Otte, D. & Perez-Gelabert, 2009) c g
 Hapithus unicolor (Olivier, G.A., 1791) c g
 Hapithus vaga (Otte, D. & Perez-Gelabert, 2009) c
 Hapithus vagus Morse, 1916 i c g
 Hapithus valida (Walker, F., 1869) c g
 Hapithus vexativa (Otte, D. & Perez-Gelabert, 2009) c g
 Hapithus vigil (Otte, D. & Perez-Gelabert, 2009) c g
 Hapithus vigilax (Otte, D. & Perez-Gelabert, 2009) c g
 Hapithus vivus (Otte, D. & Perez-Gelabert, 2009) c g
 Hapithus vocatus (Otte, D., 2015) c g
 Hapithus volatus (Otte, D., 2015) c g
 Hapithus vulgaris Gorochov, 2017 c g
 Hapithus xadani Gorochov, 2017 c g
 Hapithus xouthos (Otte, D. & Perez-Gelabert, 2009) c g
 Hapithus zatheos (Otte, D. & Perez-Gelabert, 2009) c g

Data sources: i = ITIS, c = Catalogue of Life, g = GBIF, b = Bugguide.net

References

Hapithus